The following outline is provided as an overview of and topical guide to politics and political science:

Politics – the exercise of power; process by which groups of people make collective decisions. Politics is the art or science of running governmental or state affairs (including behavior within civil governments), institutions, fields, and special interest groups such as the corporate, academic, and religious segments of society.

Political science – the field concerning the theory and practice of politics and the description and analysis of political systems and political behavior.

Fields of study of political science

 Comparative politics
 Democratization
 Polarization
 Politicization
 Multi-level governance
 see  and 
 Development studies
 Geopolitics and political geography
 Area studies 
 Globalization studies
 Gender and politics
 Institutional theory
 New institutionalism
 International relations
 Security studies
 Critical security studies
 Copenhagen School
 Paris school
 Welsh school
 Nationalism studies
 Banal nationalism
 Diaspora politics
 Irredentism
 Nationalism and gender
 Nationalist historiography
 Postnationalism
 Revanchism
 Political behavior
 Political activism
 Political movement
 Political economy
 Political fiction
 Political satire
 Political research methodology
 Political sociology
 Political theory and philosophy
 Political spectrum
 Positive political theory
 Game theory
 Psephology – study of elections
 Voting theory
 see 
 Policy analysis and Policy studies
 Foreign policy analysis
 Public administration and local government studies
 Public law
 Strategic studies

Related disciplines 

 Economics
 Political economy
 History
 Political history
 Jurisprudence
 Constitutional law
 International legal theory
 Political jurisprudence
 Philosophy
 Ethics
 Political philosophy
 Psychology
 Political psychology
 Social science
 Anthropology
 Political anthropology
 Sociology
 Political sociology

Political theory

Decision-making

Election

 Electoral systems
 Plurality voting allows each voter to vote for a single candidate, with the candidate with most votes being the winner. It is often combined with single-member districts, resulting in a majoritarian democracy.
 Cardinal voting systems
 Approval voting
 Satisfaction approval voting
 Majority judgment
 STAR voting
 First-past-the-post voting
 Single non-transferable vote
 Limited voting
 Plurality-at-large voting
 General ticket
 Proportional representation ensures that proportions of representation allocated in the elected body reflect their proportions of support among the electorate. Often combined with multi-member districts to produce consensus democracy.
 Party-list proportional representation
 Mixed electoral systems
 Mixed-member proportional representation
 Parallel voting
 Scorporo
 Majority bonus system
 Alternative vote plus
 Dual-member proportional representation
 Rural-urban proportional representation
 Suffrage
 Disfranchisement
 Right of foreigners to vote
 Right of expatriates to vote in their country of origin
 Youth suffrage
 Age of candidacy
 Demeny voting
 Voting
 Compulsory voting
 Electronic voting
 None of the above
 Secret ballot
 Game theory
 Political campaign
 Political communications
 Political qualifications

Order of succession
 Primogeniture

Sortition
 Citizens' assembly

Political institutions

Branches of government
The separation of powers is typically set in the constitution or basic law in order to achieve checks and balances within government. The typical model has three branches, and is referred to as the trias politica.

 Legislature, deliberates and passes laws.
 Unicameralism
 Bicameralism
 Upper house
 Lower house
 Tricameralism
 Tetracameralism
 Multicameralism
 Executive, executes laws.
 Head of state, formal, often symbolic, leader of state. Sometimes has veto power over proposed legislation.
 Monarch
 Supreme leader
 President
 Head of government, the person(s) in charge of day-to-day affairs of the state. Usually heads a cabinet, a Council of Ministers or a Council of State.
 Chancellor
 Chief executive
 Chief minister
 First minister
 Premier
 Prime minister
 Judiciary, often involved in politics through judicial review.
 Supreme court
 Constitutional court

Political parties
 Party systems
 Nonpartisan democracy
 One-party state
 Dominant-party system
 Two-party system
 Multi-party system
 Party coalition governments
 Hung parliament
 Confidence and supply
 Minority government
 Rainbow coalition
 Grand coalition
 National unity government
 Majority government

Political behavior

Theories of political behaviour

 Political culture
 Civic political culture
 Parochial political culture
 Patrimonialism, a political culture which sees no difference between personal and political power.
 Neopatrimonialism
 Prebendalism
 Peace and conflict studies
 Aggressionism
 Greed versus grievance
 Political psychology
 Impressionable years hypothesis
 Postmaterialism
 Right-Wing Authoritarianism
 Social Dominance Orientation
 System Justification Theory

Political strategy

 Accelerationism 
 Political campaigning
 Campaign advertising
 Campaign finance
 Campaign management tools
 Canvassing
 Grassroots fundraising
 Smear campaign
 Opposition research
 Push poll
 Retail politics
 Power politics
 Balance of power
 Bandwagoning
 Blackmail
 Brinkmanship
 Buck passing
 Coercion
 Hard power
 Sharp power
 Soft power
 Smart power
 Power projection
 Power vacuum
 Realpolitik
 Cloward–Piven strategy
 Starve the beast
 Propaganda
 Disinformation
 Fearmongering
 Framing
 Indoctrination
 Loaded language
 Lying press
 National mythology
 Rally 'round the flag effect

Voting behavior

 Abstention
 Abstentionism
 Election boycott
 Economic voting
 Altruism theory of voting
 Coattail effect
 Split-ticket voting
 Straight-ticket voting
 Tactical voting
 Tactical manipulation of runoff voting
 Vote pairing
 Paradox of voting
 Protest vote
 Spoilt vote
 Voter apathy

Political dysfunction 

 Political conflict
 Civil disobedience
 Boycott
 Demonstration
 Nonviolence
 Picketing
 Strike action
 Tax resistance
 Civil war
 Wars of national liberation
 Insurgency
 Asymmetric warfare
 Assassination
 Guerrilla warfare
 Law of war
 International criminal law
 Just war theory
 War crime
 Revolution
 Bourgeois revolution
 Communist revolution
 Democratic revolution
 Nonviolent revolution
 Social revolution
 Political revolution (Trotskyism)
 Vanguardism
 World revolution
 Terrorism
 Nationalist-separatist terrorism
 Propaganda of the deed
 Religious extremist terrorism
 Right-wing terrorism
 Left-wing terrorism
 Political corruption
 Bribery
 Cronyism
 Economics of corruption
 Nepotism
 Political patronage
 Clientelism
 Earmark
 Political machine
 Pork barrel
 Slush fund
 Spoils system

Types of polities and forms of government

By level of social organisation

 Traditional authority, political society which has not gone through state formation.
 Band society
 Big man
 Chiefdom
 Empire (before New Imperialism).
 Local government
 Unitary state (Unitarism)
 City-state
 Nation state
 Federalism
 Confederation
 Federation
 Regional integration
 Intergovernmental organization
 Supranational union
 European Union (European studies)
 Trade bloc
 Global governance
 World state

By formal power structure

 Feudalism
 Chinese feudalism
 Indian feudalism
 Monarchy/Diarchy
 Absolute monarchy
 Constitutional monarchy
 Elective monarchy
 Federal monarchy
 Republic
 Parliamentary system
 Westminster system
 Presidential system
 Semi-presidential system
 President for life

By source of power

 Autocracy, the  source of power is the leader.
 Democracy, the source of power are the people through popular sovereignty.
 Ethnocracy, the source of power is ethnicity.
 Meritocracy, the source of power is talent.
 Noocracy, talent is measured by wisdom.
 Technocracy, talent is measured by expertise.
 Stratocracy, the source of power is the military.
 Military dictatorship
 Military junta
 Theocracy, the source of power is God(s).
 Christian republic
 Halachic state
 Hindu nation
 Islamic state
 Oligarchy, the source of power is the elite.
 Aristocracy, the elite are hereditary.
 Gerontocracy, the elite are the elderly.
 Plutocracy, the source of power is wealth.

Political ideologies and philosophies 

 Authoritarianism
 Absolutism
 Totalitarianism
 Left-wing politics, usually focused on increasing egalitarianism.
 Far-left politics
 Anarchism
 Communism
 Socialism
 Agrarian socialism
 Democratic socialism
 Liberal socialism
 Libertarian socialism
 Religious socialism
 Centre-left politics
 Social democracy
 Gradualism
 Progressivism
 Reformism
 Green politics
 Green anarchism
 Ecofeminism
 Eco-socialism
 Centrism, usually defined by highly pragmatic politics.
 Radical centrism
 Syncretic politics
 Third Position
 Third Way
 Liberalism, defined by high valuing of liberty.
 Classical liberalism
 Conservative liberalism
 Neoliberalism
 Social liberalism
 Right-wing politics, often defined by opposition to social change, and a veneration of tradition.
 Centre-right politics
 Christian democracy
 Compassionate conservatism
 Liberal conservatism
 One-nation conservatism
 Progressive conservatism
 Conservatism
 Fiscal conservatism
 Fusionism
 Libertarian conservatism
 National conservatism
 Neoconservatism
 Paleoconservatism
 Social conservatism
 Traditional conservatism
 Far-right politics, political ideas which are described as reactionary, ultranationalist, chauvinistic, xenophobic or racist.
 Alt-right
 Fascism
 Nazism
 Identity politics, political ideologies concerned with the interests of the members of a specific group.
 Black power
 Feminism
 Gay pride
 Indigenism
 Islamism
 Nationalism, based on the centrality of the nation.
 Civic nationalism
 Ethnic nationalism
 Expansionist nationalism
 Irredentism
 Pan-nationalism
 Racial nationalism
 Left-wing nationalism
 Liberal nationalism
 Secessionism
 Zionism

Governments of the world

Political issues and policies

Rights

 Animal rights
 Civil and political rights, usually related to topics of negative liberty.
 Freedom of assembly
 Freedom of association
 Right to asylum
 Freedom from discrimination
 Freedom of education
 Freedom of information
 Freedom of movement
 Freedom of speech
 Freedom of the press
 Freedom of thought
 Right to petition
 Right to protest
 Right to property
 Freedom of religion
 Right to life
 Economic, social and cultural rights, usually cover issues of positive liberty.
 Digital rights
 Labor rights
 Equal pay for equal work
 Right to an adequate standard of living
 Right to clothing
 Right to development
 Right to education
 Right to food
 Right to health
 Right to housing
 Right to Internet access
 Right to science and culture
 Right to social security
 Right to water
 Right to work
 LGBT rights
 Minority rights
 Affirmative action
 Women's rights
 Abortion law

Economic policy

 Agricultural policy 
 Agricultural subsidy
 Land reform
 Energy policy
 Nuclear energy policy
 Renewable energy policy
 Fiscal policy
 Budgetary policy
 Industrial policy
 Import substitution industrialization
 Investment policy
 Sovereign wealth fund
 Monetary policy
 Capital requirement
 Central bank
 Contractionary monetary policy
 Expansionary monetary policy
 Tax policy
 Internet taxation
 Tax cut
 Tax competition
 Tax holiday
 Tax reform
 Flat tax
 Tax harmonization

Foreign and security policy

 Arms control
 Nuclear disarmament
 Nuclear-free zone
 Nuclear nonproliferation
 Criminal justice
 Capital punishment
 Life imprisonment
 Mandatory sentencing
 Space policy
 Extraterrestrial real estate
 Militarization of space
 Space force
 Counter-terrorism
 Anti-terrorism legislation
 International Trade
 Military policy
 Military recruitment
 Conscription
 Military-industrial complex

Social policy

 Cultural policy
 Arts council
 Environmental policy
 Climate change policy
 Fisheries management
 Drug policy 
 Drug decriminalization
 Drug policy reform
 Harm reduction
 Legality of cannabis
 Legal status of cocaine
 Legal drinking age
 Legal status of methamphetamine
 Legal status of psilocybin mushrooms
 Legal status of Salvia divinorum
 Education policy and reform
 Education reform
 Immigration law 
 Family reunification
 Immigration equality
 Immigration of felons
 Immigration reform
 Open border
 Permanent residency
 Work permit
 Race relations
 Affirmative action
 Institutional racism
 Racial profiling
 White privilege
 Religion and politics
 Separation of church and state
 Health policy 
 Legality of euthanasia
 Stem cell controversy
 Universal healthcare
 Health care reform
 Welfare state
 Guaranteed minimum income
 Job guarantee
 Welfare reform
 Unemployment benefits
 Universal Basic Income
 Workfare

Politics by continent

Foreign relations by continents

Political parties by continent

History of politics 

 History of political science
 History of political thinking
 Political history
 List of years in politics

Political scholars 

 List of political scientists
 List of political philosophers
 List of social and political philosophers
 List of political theorists

Influential literature 

 The Art of War – by Sun Tsu (c. 544–496 BC)
 History of the Peloponnesian War by Thucydides  (c. 460 – c. 400 BC)
 The Republic and Laws – by Plato (427–347 BC)
 The Politics and  Nicomachean Ethics – Aristotle (384–322 BC)
 Arthashastra –  (c. 350–283 BC)
  Meditations – Marcus Aurelius, Roman Emperor 161–180 CE
 The Prince – by Niccolò Machiavelli (1469–1527)
 The Book of Five Rings – Miyamoto Musashi (c. 1584––1645)
 Leviathan – Thomas Hobbes (1588–1679)
 The Wealth of Nations – by Adam Smith (1723–1790)
 On War – by Carl von Clausewitz (1780–1831)
 The Communist Manifesto – by Karl Marx (1818-1883)

 See also 

 Further reading 
Roskin, M.; Cord, R. L.; Medeiros, J. A.; Jones, W. S. (2007). Political Science: An Introduction. 10th ed. New York: Pearson Prentice Hall.  (10).  (13).
Tausch, A.; Prager, F. (1993). Towards a Socio-Liberal Theory of World Development. Basingstoke: Macmillan; New York: St. Martin's Press.Oxford Handbooks of Political Science'' – ten-volume set covering the political science topics political methodology, public policy, political theory, political economy, comparative politics, contextual political analysis, international relations, Law and Politics, political behavior, and political institutions. The general editor of the series is Robert E. Goodin.

References 
 From plato

External links 

 American Political Science Association
 European Consortium for Political Research
 International Political Science Association
 Political Studies Association of the UK
 PROL: Political Science Research Online (prepublished research)
 Truman State University Political Science Research Design Handbook
 A New Nation Votes: American Elections Returns 1787-1825
 Political links resource

Politics
Politics
 1
Politics

id:Garis besar politik
no:Oversikt over politikk
fi:Politiikan pääpiirteet
sv:Översikt över politiken
mk:Преглед на политиката и политичките науки